István Marosi (5 April 1944, Ózd – 31 January 2018) was a Hungarian handball player.

In 1972 he was part of the Hungarian team which finished eighth in the Olympic tournament. He played five matches and scored 14 goals.

Marosi also played on three World Championships in a row between 1964 and 1973, finishing eighth in all three occasions.

Awards
 Hungarian Handballer of the Year: 1966
 Nemzeti Bajnokság I Top Scorer: 1968

References

1944 births
2018 deaths
People from Ózd
Hungarian male handball players
Olympic handball players of Hungary
Handball players at the 1972 Summer Olympics
Sportspeople from Borsod-Abaúj-Zemplén County